Ben Edlund (born September 20, 1968) is an American cartoonist, screenwriter, television producer, and television director. He is best known as the creator of the satirical superhero character The Tick.

Background
Edlund was born and raised in Pembroke, Massachusetts. He attended Silver Lake Regional High School and was voted by classmates as "Most Artistic" for both the 8th grade and 12th grade yearbook superlatives. At the age of 17, without a driver's license, Edlund was forced to ride with friends and frequent their favorite hangouts. One particular destination, the New England Comics store, spawned Edlund's interest in the comic book medium, which later launched his art and writing career.

The Tick
While still in high school, he began developing his satirical superhero, The Tick, who became the mascot of the New England Comics newsletter. Edlund was invited to create a comic book series based on the character by New England Comics when, due to a production mix-up, the publisher needed a new title fast. Edlund graduated from high school in 1986 and continued to draw his popular character while majoring in film at Massachusetts College of Art. The debut issue of The Tick took a year and a half for Edlund to develop.

While still in college, Edlund was approached by Kiscom, a New Jersey-based toy licensing and design company, who wanted to develop merchandising off The Tick. Sunbow Entertainment, a New York-based animation company, paired Edlund up with writer Richard Libmann-Smith. After having their premiere episode turned down by FOX, the duo got approval with a refined version.

In 1994, The Tick debuted as an animated series on FOX and lasted three seasons. The program led to various toy and merchandising deals. The limited scope of merchandising compared to other contemporaneous animated series led Edlund to express contentment in his character as a "much more sincere proposal." The Tick appeared on the FOX network in late 2001 with a short-lived live-action series.

Screenwriting
In the late 1990s, Edlund collaborated with indie filmmaker Lisa Hammer and her husband, Eric Hammer, on the film Crawley. The Hammers later worked with him again during the creation of The Venture Bros. which draws inspiration from The Tick.

Beginning in 2002, Edlund was employed by Joss Whedon at Mutant Enemy, first as part of the original writing staff for the space/Western hybrid series Firefly, which was cancelled during its first season, and then on the final season of Angel, where he wrote and also directed the Hugo Award nominated episode, "Smile Time". Edlund credits Whedon with teaching him to create television character arcs. Edlund also had a hand in creating characters for Whedon's successful web series Doctor Horrible's Sing-Along Blog, to which he contributed "Bad Horse" and the henchman sidekick "Moist".

In 2005, Edlund served as co-executive producer on Point Pleasant. He also wrote the Star Wars: The Clone Wars second season episode "Grievous Intrigue".

Beginning in 2006, he served as executive producer, writer, and occasionally director on the TV series Supernatural from season 2 (2006–07) to season 8 (2012–13). On that show, there was a character, a writer/prophet named Chuck Shurley, who went by the pen name "Carver Edlund", a combination of Edlund's last name and that of Jeremy Carver, another Supernatural producer and writer. The writers named another important character after executive producer Robert Singer.

In 2013, Edlund left the Supernatural writing staff to join the second season of Supernatural creator Eric Kripke's new television series, Revolution. It was cancelled after that season. He then joined Gotham as a producer and writer for the first season (2014–15). In 2015, he became a writer for the second season of the Sony PlayStation Network original series Powers.

Podcast and radio appearances
Edlund appeared on Ken Reid's TV Guidance Counselor podcast on May 25, 2016.

Filmography

Film

Television

References

External links

 

American television writers
Animation screenwriters
American male television writers
Television producers from Massachusetts
Inkpot Award winners
Massachusetts College of Art and Design alumni
People from Pembroke, Massachusetts
1968 births
Living people
Tick (comics)
Screenwriters from Massachusetts